Ja'Gared Deniandruis Davis (born September 11, 1990) is an American gridiron football defensive end for the Hamilton Tiger-Cats of the Canadian Football League (CFL). He is a two-time Grey Cup champion after winning in 2018 with the Calgary Stampeders and in 2023 with the Toronto Argonauts. He played college football at Southern Methodist University. He was signed by the Houston Texans as an undrafted free agent in 2013.

Early years
He attended Crockett High School in Crockett, Texas. He was selected as the District 20-3A Defensive Co-MVP during high school.

College career
He was named First-team Conference USA and was selected to CollegeFootballNews.com All-American honorable mention during his sophomore season.
In his junior season, he was selected to the second-team All-C-USA. During his junior season, he was named FWAA National Defensive Player Of The Week for his performance against UTEP in which he had eight tackles, 1.5 sacks, one interception, three pass deflections, and a forced fumble in which he recovered for a touchdown. He was selected for the 2011 Rotary Lombardi Award Official Watch List prior his junior season. He was named to the second-team All-Texas by Dave Campbell's Texas Football during his senior season. He was named to the First-team All-C-USA following his senior season.  He finished college with the total of 301 tackles, 20.5 sacks, 4 interceptions, 20 pass deflections, and 6 forced fumbles.

Professional career

Houston Texans
On April 27, 2013, he signed with the Houston Texans as an undrafted free agent following the 2013 NFL Draft.

New England Patriots
On August 28, 2013, Davis was claimed by the New England Patriots off waivers. He was released on October 22, 2014, after the Patriots had traded for Akeem Ayers. On October 24, the Patriots re-signed him to the practice squad. On November 22, Davis was released from the New England practice squad.

Kansas City Chiefs
The Kansas City Chiefs signed Davis to their practice squad on November 25, 2014.

Washington Redskins
Davis was signed by the Washington Redskins off the Chiefs' practice squad on December 9, 2014. He was waived on July 31, 2015 after the Redskins signed Junior Galette.

Kansas City Chiefs (second stint)
The Kansas City Chiefs signed Davis on August 17, 2015. On September 5, 2015, he was waived by the Chiefs.

Calgary Stampeders
Davis was signed by the Calgary Stampeders on May 30, 2016. On November 25, 2018, Davis and the Calgary Stampeders won the 106th Grey Cup.

Hamilton Tiger-Cats
On February 13, 2019, Davis signed with the Hamilton Tiger-Cats for the 2019 CFL season. On February 10, 2020, Davis re-signed with the Tiger-Cats for the 2020 CFL season. He was released on September 23, 2020. He re-signed with Hamilton on January 14, 2021.

Toronto Argonauts
On February 8, 2022, Davis signed with the Toronto Argonauts for the  CFL season. On November 20, 2022, Davis won his second championship with the victory in the 109th Grey Cup game. He became a free agent upon the expiry of his contract on February 14, 2023.

Hamilton Tiger-Cats
On February 15, 2023, it was announced that Davis had re-signed with the Hamilton Tiger-Cats.

References

External links
Hamilton Tiger-Cats bio
SMU Mustangs bio
New England Patriots bio

1990 births
Living people
American football outside linebackers
Canadian football linebackers
African-American players of American football
African-American players of Canadian football
People from Crockett, Texas
Players of American football from Texas
SMU Mustangs football players
Houston Texans players
New England Patriots players
Kansas City Chiefs players
Washington Redskins players
Calgary Stampeders players
Hamilton Tiger-Cats players
Toronto Argonauts players
21st-century African-American sportspeople